Pietà is painting of 1637 by the Spanish artist Jusepe de Ribera, produced for the Tesoro Nuovo chapel in the Certosa di San Martino in Naples, where it still hangs.

Sources
https://www.nortonsimon.org/collections/browse_title.php?id=F.1970.03.011.D
 AA.VV., Napoli e dintorni, Touring Club Italiano Milano, 2007, 
 Francesco Abbate, Storia dell'arte nell'Italia meridionale: Il Sud angioino e aragonese, Donzelli Editore, 1998, 
 Spinosa N., Ribera – Opera completa, Editrice Electa, 2006

1637 paintings
Paintings by Jusepe de Ribera
Paintings of the Descent from the Cross
Paintings depicting Mary Magdalene
Angels in art
Paintings of the Pietà